Peltigera britannica is a species of foliose lichen belonging to the family Peltigeraceae.

It is native to Europe and North America.

References

britannica
Lichen species
Lichens of North America
Lichens of Canada
Lichens of Europe
Taxa named by Vilmos Kőfaragó-Gyelnik
Lichens described in 1932
Fungi without expected TNC conservation status